Rotch is a surname. Notable people with the surname include:

Abbott Lawrence Rotch (1861–1912), American meteorologist
Arthur Rotch (1850–1894), American architect
Edith Rotch (1874–1969), American tennis player
Benjamin Rotch (1794–1854), British barrister, politician and author
Francis J. Rotch (1863–1918), American politician from Washington State
Francis M. Rotch (1822–1863), American politician from New York
Thomas Morgan Rotch (1849–1914), American pediatrician

See also
Roch (disambiguation)